A partial solar eclipse occurred on April 6, 1913. A solar eclipse occurs when the Moon passes between Earth and the Sun, thereby totally or partly obscuring the image of the Sun for a viewer on Earth. A partial solar eclipse occurs in the polar regions of the Earth when the center of the Moon's shadow misses the Earth.

Related eclipses

Solar eclipses 1910–1913

References

External links

1913 4 6
1913 in science
1913 4 6
April 1913 events